Cyril Thomas Burke BEM (7 November 1925 – 18 January 2010) was an Australian rugby union player, a state and national representative scrum-half who made twenty-six Test appearances for the Wallabies between 1946 and 1956.

Playing career
Born in Waratah near Newcastle, New South Wales he had a long association with the Newcastle Waratahs club as both a player and coach. He made thirty-six state representative appearances for New South Wales (also called the "Waratahs").

His Australian representative debut was made against the All Blacks at Eden Park in 1946 and the following year he played in two domestic Tests against New Zealand when they toured Australia. He was selected in the 1947–48 Australia rugby union tour of the British Isles, Ireland, France and North America where he played in all five Tests. He made seven overseas rugby tours including New Zealand in 1949 and South Africa in 1953 and met those same nations as well as the British and Irish Lions in several Test series played in Australia.

Accolades
Tressider quotes from a 1988 interview with 1947 Wallaby captain Trevor Allan reflecting on the tour: "I have fond memories of the tour, none better than Cyril Burke, the little Newcastle halfback who, with Col Windon, had most impact on our games. The opposition simply never knew when he was going to put the foot down on the accelerator or pull off that fantastic sidestep"'''. His 1947 tour teammate Sir Nicholas Shehadie described him as follows: "Size was no handicap for this masterhalf-back, certainly the best I ever played with in my career. He had the biggest sidestep I ever saw from any player, delivered quick-fire service from the scrums and rucks and had a keen eye for a possible gap"''.

Honours
On 15 June 1974, Burke was awarded the British Empire Medal (BEM) in recognition of service to sport. He was awarded the Australian Sports Medal on 29 September 2000. The Cyril Burke Medal was named in his honour, and is presented annually to the top player in the New South Wales First Division.

He was inducted into the Australian Rugby Union's Hall of Fame in 2015.

References

Footnotes

External links

1925 births
2010 deaths
People from Newcastle, New South Wales
Australian rugby union players
Australia international rugby union players
Australian recipients of the British Empire Medal
Rugby union players from Newcastle, New South Wales
Rugby union scrum-halves